Federico Hernán Poggi (born 10 January 1981) is an Argentine football midfielder who plays for Villa Dálmine.

Career
Poggi began his playing career in 2001 for San Telmo of the regionalised 3rd division of Argentine football. In 2004, he moved up a division to join Sarmiento de Junín of the Primera B Nacional.

In 2005 Poggi joined Huracán and in 2007 the club attained promotion to the Primera División.  Between 2007 and 2008 Poggi played 39 games for Huracán in the Primera División.

After a brief spell in France with AC Ajaccio in 2008, Poggi returned to Argentina to join Arsenal de Sarandí.

External links
 
 BDFA profile 
 Argentine Primera statistics at Futbol XXI  

1981 births
Living people
Footballers from Buenos Aires
Argentine footballers
Association football midfielders
Club Atlético Huracán footballers
Arsenal de Sarandí footballers
AC Ajaccio players
San Martín de San Juan footballers
Expatriate footballers in France